Grissenbach is a  river of North Rhine-Westphalia, Germany, which is  in length.

See also
List of rivers of North Rhine-Westphalia

References

Rivers of North Rhine-Westphalia
Rivers of Siegerland
Rivers of Germany